Gorodishche is a town and the administrative center of Gorodishchensky District in Penza Oblast, Russia, located on the Yulovka River (Sura's tributary)  east of Penza, the administrative center of the oblast. The 2010 census found it had a population of 8096.

History
It was founded in 1681 as a fortress; town status was granted to it in 1780.

Administrative and municipal status
Within the framework of administrative divisions, Gorodishche serves as the administrative center of Gorodishchensky District. As an administrative division, it is incorporated within Gorodishchensky District as the town of district significance of Gorodishche. As a municipal division, the town of district significance of Gorodishche is incorporated within Gorodishchensky Municipal District as Gorodishche Urban Settlement.

Notable residents 

Ivan Smirnov (1881–1936), Bolshevik revolutionary, Soviet politician and Communist Party functionary

References

Notes

Sources

External links
Gorodishche Business Directory  

Cities and towns in Penza Oblast
Gorodishchensky Uyezd
Gorodishchensky District, Penza Oblast